Orange most often refers to:

Orange (fruit), the fruit of the tree species  Citrus × sinensis
 Orange blossom, its fragrant flower
Orange (colour), from the color of an orange, occurs between red and yellow in the visible spectrum 
Some other citrus or citrus-like fruit, see list of plants known as orange
Orange (word), both a noun and an adjective in the English language

Orange may also refer to:

Arts, entertainment, and media

Films
 Game of Life (film), a 2007 film originally known as Oranges
 Orange (2010 film), a Telugu-language film
 The Oranges (film), a 2011 American romantic comedy starring Hugh Laurie
 Orange (2012 film), a Malayalam-language film
 Orange (2015 film), a Japanese film
 Orange (2018 film), a Kannada-language film

Music

Groups and labels
 Orange (band), an American punk rock band, who formed in 2002 from California
 Orange Record Label, a Canadian independent record label, founded 2003

Albums
 Orange (Al Stewart album), a 1972 folk album
 Orange (Jon Spencer Blues Explosion album), a 1994 alternative rock album
 Orange (Watanabe Misato album), a 2003 J-pop album
 Orange (Mario Pavone album), a 2003 jazz album
 Orange (2010 soundtrack), from the Telugu romantic film of the same name
 Orange (Dark Suns album), a 2011 studio album

Songs
 "L'Orange" (song), a 1964 pop song by Gilbert Bécaud
 "Orange", a song by Love Battery on the 1990 album Between the Eyes
 "Orange" (song), a 2007 comedy rock song by David O'Doherty
 "Orange", a song by Art Alexakis on the 2019 album Sun Songs

Other uses in arts entertainment, and media
 Oranges, a 1967 short book by John McPhee
 Orange (TV channel), a former name of New Zealand channel Sky 5, launched in 1994
 Orange, a character in the 2009 web series Annoying Orange
 Orange (manga), a 2012 series

Businesses
 Orange (animation studio), a Japanese 3DCG animation company
 Orange Music Electronic Company, a British amplifier maker
 Orange S.A., formerly France Télécom, a France-based multinational telecommunications company which owns multiple international operators, including:
 Orange (India)
 Orange Belgium
 Orange Egypt
 Orange España (Spain)
 Orange Jordan
 Orange Moldova
 Orange Morocco
 Orange Polska (Poland)
 Orange Romania
 Orange Slovensko (Slovakia)
 Orange RDC (Democratic Republic of the Congo)
 Orange Tunisia
 Orange UK

People with the  name
 Orange (name), a surname and given name
 James O'Meara (1919–1974), Royal Air Force Second World War flying ace, nicknamed Orange

Places

Historic
 Orange Free State, a 19th-century Boer republic; later a province of South Africa
 Principality of Orange (1163–1713), a feudal state in what is now France

Australia
 Orange, New South Wales, a city
 City of Orange (New South Wales), a local government area based in the city
 Electoral district of Orange, a district in the New South Wales Legislative Assembly
 Orange wine region, a registered Australian Geographical Indication

France
 Orange (ski resort), a village and resort located in the commune of Saint-Sixt
 Orange, Vaucluse, a commune in the Vaucluse department in the Provence-Alpes-Côte d'Azur region
 Canton of Orange, an administrative division of the Vaucluse department, France

United States
 Orange, California, a city
 Orange, Connecticut, a town
 Orange, Georgia, an unincorporated community
 Orange, Illinois, an unincorporated community
 Orange, Indiana, an unincorporated community
 Orange, Massachusetts, a town
 Orange (CDP), Massachusetts, a census-designated place in the town
 Orange, Missouri, an unincorporated community
 Orange, New Hampshire, a town
 The Oranges, four municipalities in Essex County, New Jersey, which have "Orange" in their name
 Orange, New Jersey, a township
 Orange, New York, a town
 Orange, North Dakota or Arvilla, an unincorporated community
 Orange, Ohio, a village in Cuyahoga County
 Orange, Coshocton County, Ohio, an unincorporated community
 Orange, Delaware County, Ohio, an unincorporated community
 Orange, Texas, a city
 Orange, Vermont, a town
 Orange, Virginia, a town
 Orange, Wisconsin, a town
 Orange Creek, Florida
 Orange Island (Florida), a prehistoric landmass

Multiple entries
 Orange Bay (disambiguation)
 Orange City (disambiguation)
 Orange County (disambiguation)
 Orange Lake (disambiguation)
 Orange Park (disambiguation)
 Orange River (disambiguation)
 Orange Township (disambiguation)

Elsewhere
 Cape Orange, on the coast of Brazil
 Jayawijaya Mountains, a mountain range in the Indonesian part of New Guinea, formerly known as the Orange Range
 Orange Isle, Xiang River, Changsha, Hunan

Software
 Orange (software), a data analysis software suite

Sports
 Netherlands national football team, nicknamed "Orange"
 Syracuse Orange ("the Orange"; formerly, the Orangemen), the athletic teams of Syracuse University
 Otto the Orange, the team mascot

Transportation

Train stations
 Orange railway station, New South Wales, a train station in Orange, New South Wales, Australia
 Orange station (California), a train station in Orange, California, United States
 Orange station (NJ Transit), a New Jersey Transit station in Orange, New Jersey, United States
 Orange station (Vaucluse), an SNCF station in Vaucluse, Provence-Alpes-Côte d'Azur, France

Vessels
 Gitana 13, an ocean racing catamaran named Orange in 2002
 , two Royal Navy ships
 Orange II (boat), an ocean racing catamaran
 , a World War II frigate

Other uses
 Orange (heraldry), a tincture used in heraldry
 House of Orange-Nassau, a European aristocratic dynasty
 Orange High School (disambiguation)
 Orange Order, a Protestant organization
 Orange Revolution, which occurred in Ukraine in 2004
 War Plan Orange, a series of United States war plans

See also

 
 
 Orange II (disambiguation)
 L'Orange (disambiguation)
 Orangery, a room or building for fruit trees
 Orangism (disambiguation)
 Oranje (disambiguation)
 Ornge, the air ambulance service for the Canadian province of Ontario